Zachary David Frazer (born February 23, 1988) is a former American football quarterback who is now a coach. He played most of his college career for the University of Connecticut Huskies.  He originally was a member of the University of Notre Dame Fighting Irish during his freshman year.

Frazer was not drafted coming out of college, but played professionally in Denmark and Arena football. He played football in his high school days at Mechanicsburg Area Senior High School. Frazier was a participant in the 2005 Elite 11 Competition.

College career 
Frazer signed a national letter of intent to play quarterback for the Fighting Irish on February 1, 2006.  After sitting out his freshman year as a redshirt, Frazer was told that he wouldn't compete for the starting quarterback position after spring practice in 2007.  On July 1, 2007, he announced that he was transferring to Connecticut. At Connecticut Frazier was the starting quarterback from 2008-2010.

Professional career
Frazer signed with the Danish team Triangle Razorbacks in the National Ligaen after the 2012 NFL Scouting Combine. In October 2012, Triangle Razorbacks became Danish Champions after winning the Mermaid Bowl. Frazer was the starting quarterback for the whole season.

In March 2013, Frazer was assigned with the Chicago Rush of the Arena Football League, Frazer was reassigned in April before playing a game for the Rush.

On April 24, 2013, Frazer was assigned with the San Antonio Talons. On March 10, 2014, he was reassigned by the Talons.

Coaching
Frazier has been a coach in Norway for the Oslo Vikings as well as the high school level and at Ave Maria University in USA.

References 

1988 births
Living people
Players of American football from Pennsylvania
American football quarterbacks
UConn Huskies football players
People from Mechanicsburg, Pennsylvania
Chicago Rush players
San Antonio Talons players
American expatriate sportspeople in Denmark
American expatriate players of American football